The  –  ( in Croatian and Italian) is a regional political party with strong local-patriotic, autonomous and progressive-liberal tendencies, based in the city of Rijeka, Croatia (known as Fiume in Italian). Founded in 2006, the party is active primarily within the confines of the city of Rijeka and the boroughs surrounding it (the so-called Rijeka ring). Its main aim is to achieve increased authority and development for the regional and local government through the retention of 70% of the locally collected taxes, which currently go to the central government in Zagreb.

The current party president is Danko Švorinić, and its governing body is a 9-member presidency council.

The party has two members in the Rijeka city council (receiving 6% of the vote in the local elections of 2013) and 8 elected councilors in city district councils.

Since 2010, Lista za Rijeku – Lista per Fiume is a full member of the European Free Alliance.

Electoral history

Legislative

European Parliament

External links

2006 establishments in Croatia
Liberal parties in Croatia
Political parties established in 2006
Progressive parties
Regionalist parties in Croatia
Social liberal parties